Ayşe Ayşin Bombaci Bilgin is an Australian statistician and statistics educator. She is an associate professor of mathematics and statistics at Macquarie University and the president-elect of the International Association for Statistical Education.

Education
Bilgin earned a master's degree in statistics from the University of Newcastle (Australia) in 1997, and completed her PhD in 2004 in the University of Newcastle School of Medical Practice and Population Health.

Recognition
Bilgin became an Elected Member of the International Statistical Institute in 2015. She is president-elect of the International Association for Statistical Education for the 2019–2021 term, and will become president in the following term.

References

External links

Year of birth missing (living people)
Living people
Australian statisticians
Women statisticians
Statistics educators
University of Newcastle (Australia) alumni
Academic staff of Macquarie University
Elected Members of the International Statistical Institute